Reflection is an album released in 1984 by Demis Roussos.

After having collaborated several times since the days of Aphrodite's Child, Reflection was the last album on which Roussos and Vangelis collaborated. Another member from that band, guitarist Argyris 'Silver' Koulouris, also appears on this album. Vangelis' habitual collaborators, jazz saxophonist Dick Morrissey, and vocalists Carol Kenyon and Tessa Niles also appear.

Track listing
"When a Man Loves a Woman"  (A. Wright & C. Lewis)
"Stand by Me"  (J. Leiber, M. Stoller, King & Nelson)
"Love Me Tender" (Elvis Presley & Vera Matson)
"The Great Pretender"  (Buck Raum)
"Stormy Weather" (Ted Koehler & Harold Arlen)
"I Almost Lost My Mind" (Ivory Joe Hunter)
"Marie Jolie" (R. Francis & Vangelis)
"Smoke Gets in Your Eyes" (Otto Harbach & Jerome Kern)
"As Time Goes By"  (H. Hupfeld)

Personnel
Produced and arranged by Vangelis.
Guitars: Argyris 'Silver' Koulouris
Saxophone: Dick Morrissey
Backing vocals: Carol Kenyon and Tessa Niles
Engineers: Raphael Preston and Jess Sutcliffe

Charts

References

1984 albums
Demis Roussos albums
Mercury Records albums